Terrorize Brutalize Sodomize is the sixth album by Swedish death metal band Vomitory. It was released on April 20, 2007, on Metal Blade.

Track listing
"Eternal Trail of Corpses" – 2:38
"Scavenging the Slaughtered" – 3:52
"Terrorize Brutalize Sodomize" – 3:44
"The Burning Black" – 5:23
"Defiled and Inferior" – 3:07
"March into Oblivion" – 4:50
"Whispers from the Dead" – 4:25
"Heresy" – 3:27
"Flesh Passion" – 4:19
"Cremation Ceremony" – 5:22

Personnel
Erik Rundqvist – bass guitar, vocals
Tobias Gustafsson – drums
Peter Östlund – guitar
Urban Gustafsson – guitar
Vomitory – production
Rikard Löfgren – backing vocals on "Terrorize Brutalize Sodomize", production, engineering, mixing, mastering
Henrik Hedlund – design, cover concept, photography, layout

Release history
Terrorize Brutalize Sodomize was released on April 20, 2007, in Germany, Austria and Switzerland; on April 23, 2007, in the rest of Europe; and on May 1, 2007, in North America.

References

2007 albums
Vomitory (band) albums
Metal Blade Records albums